CCGS Brant was a Canadian Coast Guard vessel in service between 1928 and 1966. Stationed on the East Coast of Canada, Brant was deployed as a navigation aids tender. Brant was the last coal-burning vessel in Canadian government service.

Description
Brant was a steel-hulled vessel of trawler-design. The ship was powered by a triple expansion steam engine driving one screw, creating  .

Service history
Brant was constructed by the Government Shipyard in Sorel, Quebec and was launched in 1927. The vessel was completed in 1928. The vessel was the second ship to be named for Joseph Brant in Canadian service. Initially in service with the Department of Marine as CGS Brant, Brant served as a navigation aids vessel for the Department of Transport's Marine Service, stationed at Dartmouth, Nova Scotia. In 1962, Brant joined the Canadian Coast Guard. The vessel was decommissioned in 1966 and sold in 1967. Brant was the last coal-burning vessel in the Canadian government fleet.

Notes

Citations

Sources

External links
 Annual Departmental Reports

Navaids tenders of the Canadian Coast Guard
Service vessels of Canada
1927 ships
Ships built in Quebec
Steamships